Gary Innes (born 13 December 1980) is a Scottish musician, shinty player, composer and a broadcaster from Spean Bridge, Lochaber, Scotland.

He was a founder member of Scottish folk-rock band Mànran.

Music

Innes has had a professional career playing the piano accordion since 2003, and is noted for his distinctive purple accordion.

He joined Runrig on stage at their concert Beat the Drum in Drumnadrochit on 18 August 2007 where he played to an audience of 17,500 and has continued to join the band on Clash of the Ash at many of their open air shows. This included joining Runrig for their farewell concerts at Stirling Castle on 17 and 18 August 2018 to over 50,000 people.

In 2010, Innes formed Mànran who aimed to become the first band since Runrig to enter a Scottish Gaelic song into the UK Top 40 when they released their first single, "Latha Math" on 17 January 2011. With a midweek high of no. 29 it fell short, finishing the week in 61st place, however they managed no. 1 in the UK singer/songwriter charts, no. 6 in the Scottish charts, and no. 6 in the Radio 1 indie charts.

Together with Mànran and Pop Idol winner Michelle McManus, Innes created the official 2012 STV Children's Appeal charity single "Take You There" and performed it live on the show. The appeal raised two million pounds for under-privileged children in Scotland.

Innes was musical director of the BBC ALBA Hogmanay show in 2011, 2012, 2013, 2014.

In 2015 Innes created Scotland's first collaborative charity folk single with a piece of music he composed called "Our Heroes". This commemorated the centenary of the Battle of Festubert and included a performance on the set of bagpipes that were being played by Lance Corporal Donald Patterson when he fell in battle on 18 May 1915, 100 years to the day. All proceeds were donated to Scotland's veterans charity Erskine.

Innes was awarded "Instrumentalist of the Year" at the 2017 MG Alba Scots Trad Music Awards.

Shinty

Innes started playing shinty at a young age, playing for Kilmonivaig Primary and then local side Lochaber. When their youth team folded, he moved to Fort William Shinty Club, where he developed into one of the leading players of the 2000s. He usually played at wing centre and wing forward in his formative years.

He was captain and man of the match for their famous victory in the 2005 Camanachd Cup final over local rivals Kilmallie and part of the team in the club's historic league championship in 2006.

He has also featured for fourteen years in the Composite Rules Shinty/Hurling International for Scotland. For the 2009/10 Shinty/Hurling International, Innes was named captain of the Scotland team. Ireland's All Star Tommy Walsh broke Innes's nose in the opening minutes of the 2010 International at Croke Park however Innes continued and scored 7 points for Scotland eventually beating the Irish 22-21.

He has reached iconic status in the game of shinty, an image of him playing the sport being used by Runrig on the cover of their 2007 album, Everything You See.

Innes wore his No. 9 Scotland captain's jersey on stage during Runrig's final two concerts at Stirling Castle in 2018 and then auctioned off the signed strip to raise money for youth development within the sport. The shirt sold for £4591.

In 2010 Innes was named Marine Harvest and National "Player of the Year" and for his shinty and musical talent was invited to the Queen's garden party at Holyrood.

Transworld Sport filmed a programme on Innes which was broadcast in 2010.

Innes double career as a high-profile shinty player and musician has resulted in a lot of attention.  In March 2009 Innes claimed that he knew a rival team had deliberately targeted him for injury due to his musical prowess.

On 15 May 2010 in a game against Premier Division strugglers GMA, Innes scored 9 goals in a 14-0 victory. Innes claimed he was denied a record 10 by the referee didn't notice the ball returning out of the goal after hitting the back stanchion. This would have given him the record for most goals scored in one single game.

On 18 September 2010, Innes scored 2 out of 3 Fort's goals against Kingussie in the 103rd Camanachd Cup final at Bught Park in Inverness. The win against Kingussie put the team's name on the trophy for the 4th year running. Innes's performance also claimed the Albert Smith Medal for the second time, having previously won it in 2005.

Innes retired on a high at the end of the 2014 season, restoring Fort William to the Premier Division and earning his final cap for Scotland.  This was due to increased musical commitments.

On 30 March 2019, Innes was named by the Camanachd Association as their first ever ambassador of The Camanachd Cup.

In June 2022, Innes returned to play for the newly formed Cruachanside.

Broadcasting
From the start of the 2010 season, Innes wrote a weekly blog for bbc.co.uk and when he is not himself playing, he is often involved in summarising for the BBC in front of camera or from the commentary box.

In 2014 BBC ALBA filmed Innes and Mànran for a one-hour documentary as the band toured across Australia, America and the UK.

On 24 September 2016 Innes took over from Robbie Shepherd as presenter of Take the Floor. Since 5 April 2020 Innes has also presented a Sunday show on BBC Radio Scotland called Take the Floor - Your Requests later renamed to Your Requests with Gary Innes.

Innes alongside BBC Radio Scotland presenter Brian Burnett co-hosted BBC Radio Scotland's 40th anniversary celebrations for radio and television from the Glasgow Barrowland Ballroom on 4 November 2018.

Personal life
Innes was a part-time fire-fighter in the Scottish Fire & Rescue Service in Spean Bridge from 1999 to 2015 and a First Responder from 2007 to 2016.

On 8 April 2017, Innes married Hannah Matheson, niece of Karen Matheson of Capercaillie, in a marquee on the Taynuilt shinty field. They have two daughters.

Discography
How's the Craic? (2005)
Era (2017)
Imminent (2019)

With Box Club
 Box Club (2008)

With Ewan Robertson
 Shouts (2009)

With Mànran
 Latha Math (2011)
 Mànran (2011)
 The Test (2013)
 An Dà Là - The Two Days (2017)
 When You Go (2018)

References

External links

  
 

Shinty players
Scottish accordionists
Living people
1981 births
21st-century Scottish male singers
Place of birth missing (living people)
People from Lochaber
People educated at Lochaber High School
Mànran members
21st-century accordionists
Scottish radio presenters